The Mindanao squirrel (Sundasciurus mindanensis) is a species of rodent in the family Sciuridae. It is endemic to the Philippines.

References

Thorington, R. W. Jr. and R. S. Hoffman. 2005. Family Sciuridae. pp. 754–818 in Mammal Species of the World a Taxonomic and Geographic Reference. D. E. Wilson and D. M. Reeder eds. Johns Hopkins University Press, Baltimore.

Sundasciurus
Rodents of the Philippines
Mammals described in 1890
Endemic fauna of the Philippines
Fauna of Mindanao
Taxa named by Joseph Beal Steere
Taxonomy articles created by Polbot